Don Allen Farrell (born July 28, 1947) is an educator, local historian and author based on the island of Tinian  in the Commonwealth of the Northern Mariana Islands (CNMI). He is known for his research and publications on the history of the Marianas Islands with an emphasis on World War II.

Early life 
Don Allen Farrell was born on July 28, 1947 in Redmond, Oregon. 

Farrell received his high school diploma from Hillcrest High School in Salt Lake City, Utah in 1965 and afterwards joined the United States Air Force (USAF) where he served until 1971. Upon completing his tour of duty in the USAF, he enrolled at California State University at Fullerton, where he earned a BA in Biology in 1973. He went on to earn a secondary teaching credential at California State University San Bernardino in 1974.

Academic and public career 
Farrell's academic career began at Rim of the World High School in Lake Arrowhead, California in 1975. In 1977, he moved to the island of Guam, where he taught at Inarajan Jr. High School and John F. Kennedy High School. During his early years on Guam, he began a fascination with and subsequent research into the history of  WWII on that island. In 1980, he joined the Guam Legislature as a Public Relations Officer, and in 1982 took on the role of Chief of Staff for the Speaker of the Guam Legislature.

In 1987, Farrell moved to the island of Tinian where he worked as a high school teacher at Tinian High School and a Historical Consultant for the CNMI Public School System. From 1989 to 2014, Farrell served on the Senior Management Team of the Governor of Guam, as the Public Information Officer for the Tinian Municipal Government and as Chief of Staff for the Office of the Mayor of Tinian.

Publications

Books 
 Liberation–1944: The Pictorial History of Guam, Micronesian Productions (1984) 
 The Americanization of Guam:  1898-1918,  Micronesian Productions (1986) 
 Tinian: A Brief History,  Micronesian Productions (1988) 
 The Sacrifice of Guam: 1919–1943,  Micronesian Productions (1991) 
 The History of the Northern Mariana Islands, CNMI Public School System (1991)
 Saipan: A Brief History, Micronesian Productions (1992) 
 Guam: A Brief History, Micronesian Productions (1994)
 Rota: A Brief History, Micronesian Productions (2003)
 History of the Mariana Islands to Partition (2012) 
 Modern History of the Northern Mariana Islands (2017)
 Tinian and The Bomb (2017)

Articles and essays 
 "The Northern Marianas:  Mine Eyes Have Seen the Glory" Glimpses of Micronesia and the Western Pacific (1979: Volume 19: 4)
 "Spare The Bullets:  Save our People"  Glimpses of Micronesia and the Western Pacific (1980: Volume 20: 4)
 "A Marriage Made in Micronesia"  Guam Business News (November 1988)
 "The Partition of the Marianas:  A Diplomatic History, 1898–1919" Isla: A Journal of Micronesian Studies (2.2 Dry Season, 1994: 273-301)
 "Operations Tearaway & Tattersalls: The Battle for The Northern Mariana Islands" Chapter 8 in Toni L. Carrell, (Ed.) CNMI Maritime Context: A Maritime History and Archaeological Overview of the Commonwealth of the Northern Mariana Islands, Ships of Discovery, 2012.

Awards and citations 
 Resolution of Commendation; Guam Legislature, 1987
 Proclamation of Commendation; Governor of Guam, 1987
 Ancient Order of the Chamorri; Governor of Guam, 1991
 CNMI Governor’s Award for the Arts, 1991
 CNMI Governor's Award for Preservation of History, 2011
 CNMI Governor’s Award for Publications in History, 2018
 CNMI Senate Commemorative Resolution, 2019

References 

1947 births
Living people